Fußballclub Gelsenkirchen-Schalke 04 e. V., commonly known as FC Schalke 04, Schalke 04, or abbreviated as S04, is a professional German football and multi-sports club originally from the Schalke district of Gelsenkirchen, North Rhine-Westphalia. The "04" in the club's name derives from its formation in 1904. Schalke have been one of the most popular professional football teams in Germany, even though the club's heyday was in the 1930s and 1940s. Schalke have played in the Bundesliga, the top tier of the German football league system, since 2022, following promotion from the 2. Bundesliga in 2021–22. As of 2022, the club has 160,000 members, making it the second-largest football club in Germany and the fourth-largest club in the world in terms of membership. Other activities offered by the club include athletics, basketball, handball, table tennis, winter sports and eSports.

Schalke have won seven German championships, five DFB-Pokals, one DFB Ligapokal, one DFL-Supercup and one UEFA Cup. In 1937, Schalke became the first German club to win the double. Since 2001, Schalke's stadium has been the Veltins-Arena. Schalke hold a long-standing rivalry with Ruhr neighbours Borussia Dortmund, known as the Revierderby.

History

1904–1927: Schalke's early years

The club was founded on 4 May 1904 as Westfalia Schalke by a group of high school students and first wore the colours red and yellow. The team was unable to gain admittance to the Westdeutscher Spielverband (Western German Football Association) and played in one of the "wild associations" of early German football. In 1912, after years of failed attempts to join the official league, they merged with the gymnastic club Schalker Turnverein 1877 in order to facilitate their entry. This arrangement held up until 1915, when SV Westfalia Schalke was re-established as an independent club. The separation proved short-lived and the two came together again in 1919 as Turn- und Sportverein Schalke 1877. The new club won its first honours in 1923 as champions of the Schalke Kreisliga. It was around this time that Schalke picked up the nickname Die Knappen, from an old German word for "miners" because the team drew so many of its players and supporters from the coal miners of Gelsenkirchen.

In 1924, the football team parted ways with the gymnasts again, this time taking the club chairman along with them. They took the name FC Schalke 04 and adopted the now familiar blue and white kit from which their second nickname would derive, Die Königsblauen. The following year, the club became the dominant local side, based on a style of play that used short, sharp, man-to-man passing to move the ball. This system would later become famous as the Schalker Kreisel. In 1927, it carried them into the top-flight Gauliga Ruhr, onto the league championship, and then into the opening rounds of the national finals.

1928–1933: Rise to dominance
The popular club built a new stadium, the Glückauf-Kampfbahn, in 1928, and acknowledged the city's support by renaming themselves FC Gelsenkirchen-Schalke 04. They won their first West German championship in 1929, but the following year were sanctioned for exceeding salary levels set by the league and, in an era that considered professionalism in sport to be anathema, found themselves banned from play for nearly half a year.

However, the ban had little impact on the team's popularity: in their first match after the ban against Fortuna Düsseldorf, in June 1931, the team drew 70,000 spectators to its home ground. The club's fortunes begun to rise from 1931 and they made a semi-final appearance in the 1932 German championship, losing 1–2 to Eintracht Frankfurt. The year after, the club went all the way to the final, where Fortuna Düsseldorf proved the better side, winning 3–0.

1933–1945: The championship years
With the re-organisation of German football in 1933 under Nazi Germany, Schalke found themselves in the Gauliga Westfalen, 1 of 16 top-flight divisions established to replace the innumerable regional and local leagues, all claiming top status. This league saw Schalke's most successful decade in their history: from 1933 to 1942, the club would appear in 14 of 18 national finals (ten in the German championship and eight in the Tschammerpokal, the predecessor of today's DFB-Pokal) and win their league in every one of its eleven seasons.

The club never lost a home match in the Gauliga Westfalen in all these 11 seasons and only lost six away matches, while remaining unbeaten in the 1935–36, 1936–37, 1937–38, 1938–39, 1940–41 and 1942–43 seasons, a sign of the club's dominance.
Schalke's first national title came in 1934 with a 2–1 victory over favourites 1. FC Nürnberg. The next year, they successfully defended their title against VfB Stuttgart with a 6–4 win. The club missed the 1936 final, but would make appearances in the championship match in each of the next six years, coming away victorious in 1937, 1939, 1940 and 1942. Three of those national finals were against Austrian teams – Admira Wien, Rapid Wien and First Vienna – which played in Germany's Gauliga Ostmark after Austria's incorporation into the Reich through the 1938 Anschluss.

Die Königsblauen also made frequent appearances in the final of the Tschammerpokal, but enjoyed much less success there. They lost the inaugural Tschammerpokal 0–2 to 1. FC Nürnberg in 1935. They also made failed appearances in the 1936, 1941, and 1942 finals with their only victory coming in 1937 against Fortuna Düsseldorf.

Over a dozen seasons, from 1933 to 1945, Schalke won 162 of 189 Gauliga matches, drawing 21 and losing only 6. Within this period, they scored 924 goals and conceded just 145. From 1935 to 1939, they did not lose a single league match. The club's dominance throughout this period led them to be held up for propaganda purposes by the Nazi regime as an example of "new Germany".

1945–1959: Football after World War II

With Germany in chaos towards the end of World War II, Schalke played just two matches in 1945. They resumed regular play following the war and, for a time, continued to compete as a strong side. They set a record in a national championship round match with a 20–0 drubbing of SpVgg Herten, but that spoke more to the weakened condition of German football than to the ability of the team. Schalke's play fell off and the best they could manage in the new Oberliga West in 1947 was a sixth-place finish. Within two years, they slipped to 12th place.

It would take Schalke until the mid-1950s to recover their form. They finished third in a tight three-way race for the 1954 Oberliga West title, decided on the last day of the season. The following year, they appeared in the DFB-Pokal final, where they lost 2–3 to Karlsruher SC. The club's next, and to date last, German championship came in 1958 with a 3–0 victory over Hamburger SV. The strong fanbase of the club is as well documented in a local church, St. Joseph, in Gelsenkirchen. It was renovated shortly after the 1958 victory, where one of the glass windows shows Aloysius Gonzaga with a football and the dress and colors of Schalke.

1960–2000: Entry to the Bundesliga and the Euro Fighters
Schalke continued to play well, delivering a number of top four finishes in the years leading up to the 1963 formation of the Bundesliga, West Germany's new federal, professional league. Those results earned them selection as 1 of 16 clubs admitted to the top-flight league.

Their first years in the Bundesliga were difficult. In 1964–65, they escaped relegation only through the expansion of the league to 18 teams. A number of finishes at the lower end of the league table followed, before a marked improvement in 1971–72, culminating in a second-place finish to Bayern Munich and after having led the league for much of the season. In the same season, Schalke won the DFB-Pokal for the second time in its history.

Despite their improved results, the seeds of a major reversal had already been sown. A number of the team's players and officials were accused of accepting bribes as part of the widespread Bundesliga scandal of 1971. Investigation showed that Schalke had deliberately played to lose their 17 May, 28th-round match against Arminia Bielefeld, 0–1. As a result, several Schalke players were banned for life, including three – Klaus Fischer, "Stan" Libuda and Klaus Fichtel – who regularly played for the West Germany national team at the time.

Even though the penalties were later commuted to bans ranging from six months to two years, the scandal had a profound effect on what might have possibly become one of the dominant German teams of the 1970s. In 1973, the club moved to the Parkstadion, newly built for the 1974 FIFA World Cup and having a capacity of 70,000 spectators. In the wake of the scandal, the club's performance was uneven. They managed another second-place result in 1976–77, finishing just one point behind champions Borussia Mönchengladbach.

In the early 1980s, Die Knappen ran into trouble and found themselves relegated to the second division of the Bundesliga for the 1981–82 season and, after promotion, again in 1983–84. They returned to the top flight in 1984 but slipped once more to the second tier in 1988. They returned to the Bundesliga in the 1991–92 season and stayed in the top flight until 2021.

The club earned their first honours since the DFB-Pokal win of 1972 with a victory in the final of the 1996–97 UEFA Cup over Inter Milan on penalties. Coached by the Dutch coach Huub Stevens, the 1997 Schalke squad earned the nickname "Euro Fighters", which is still in use among fans. Stevens, who was widely unknown in Germany at the time, quickly earned himself a cult following among the Schalke supporters.

Stevens successfully implemented a system of rigid discipline, especially in the defence. His motto "Die Null muß stehen" (in English, "It has to read nil"), which emphasized his importance on his side not conceding any goals, has found its way into everyday language in Germany.

2000–2019: Top-table mainstay, European semi-final 
The turn of the millennium has seen much stronger performances from Schalke. During the 1990s and early 2000, the club underwent a successful transformation into a modern, commercial sports organization and established itself as one of the dominant teams of the Bundesliga. Schalke captured consecutive DFB-Pokals in 2000–01 and 2001–02, and earned second-place finishes in the Bundesliga in 2000–01, 2004–05 and 2006–07. The 2000–01 season finish was heartbreaking for Schalke's supporters as it took a goal in the fourth minute of injury time by Bayern Munich away to Hamburger SV to snatch the title from Die Königsblauen.

 The last few years have been more successful for Schalke, who finished in the second place in 2005, a result that led to Schalke making its second appearance in the UEFA Champions League. There, Schalke finished in third place during the group stage and continuing into the UEFA Cup, where they were eliminated by the eventual winners Sevilla in the semi-finals. In 2005–06, Schalke finished in fourth place in the Bundesliga and a year later they again finished as runners-up for the third time in seven seasons.

In the 2007–08 season, Schalke progressed past the Champions League group stage for the first time and advanced to the quarter-finals after defeating Porto on penalties in the round of 16. They were eliminated by Barcelona in the quarter-finals, losing both home and away matches 0–1.

On 9 October 2006, Russian oil company Gazprom became the club's new sponsor. The company stated it expected to invest as much as €125 million in the club over a five-and-a-half-year period. Gazprom's sponsorship has been seen by some analysts as a politically motivated attempt to buy friendship in Germany. Within this sponsorship, Schalke 04 and Zenit Saint Petersburg signed a "partnership agreement"; both clubs intend to work closely on improving football-related issues.

On 13 April 2008, the club announced the dismissal of manager Mirko Slomka after a heavy defeat at the hands of Werder Bremen and elimination from the Champions League. Former players Mike Büskens and Youri Mulder were put in charge of the first team on an interim basis. For the 2008–09 Bundesliga season, Schalke signed a new head coach, Fred Rutten, previously of Twente. Rutten signed a contract running until June 2010. In March 2009, Rutten was sacked and, once more, Mike Büskens, Youri Mulder and Oliver Reck took over the helm.

On 1 July 2009, Felix Magath, who had led VfL Wolfsburg to the top of the table in the Bundesliga, became head coach and general manager of the Königsblauen. The appointment of Magath as manager coincided with a multimillion-euro spending spree, allowing Schalke to acquire internationally known forwards Klaas-Jan Huntelaar and Raúl. Magath's tenure at the club was initially successful, seeing the side score a glut of goals in the first few months of the season, though defensive frailties and Magath's questionable squad selection had made him unpopular with Schalke supporters by December 2010.

On 16 March 2011, Magath was sacked and replaced with Ralf Rangnick, who previously, between 2004 and 2005, had a brief spell being in charge of the team. Within just weeks of his appointment, Rangnick masterminded a 5–2 victory over Inter Milan at the San Siro during the quarter-finals of the Champions League. Schalke advanced to the semi-final where they lost 2–0 to Manchester United in the first leg and 4–1 in the second leg. However, Schalke 04 managed to win the 2010–11 DFB-Pokal after a thrashing victory 5–0 over MSV Duisburg. On 1 June 2011, Schalke's captain, Manuel Neuer, made his move to Bayern Munich.

On 22 September 2011, Ralf Rangnick announced his immediate resignation as head coach of Schalke 04 due to long-term exhaustion. Assistant coach Seppo Eichkorn coached the team as interim manager until the appointment of Huub Stevens on 27 September 2011. Stevens' contract was to run until 30 June 2013.

Despite having legendary status among Schalke supporters, Stevens' return to Schalke was met with some scepticism as fans feared that Stevens, who coached Schalke to the 1997 UEFA Cup win with a rigidly defensive system, could abandon Rangnick's system of attacking play in favour of returning to his 1997 defensive antics. The doubts of the supporters proved unfounded. Although Schalke played a somewhat inconsistent season, they reached third place in the Bundesliga and therefore direct qualification for the UEFA Champions League.

Schalke had an excellent start to the 2012–13 Bundesliga season, and worked their way to second place in the league by November, just behind Bayern Munich. On 20 October, Schalke traveled to Borussia Dortmund for matchday 8, and were able to defeat the home side 2–1 to secure their first league Revierderby win since February 2010 while securing a Champions League place by finishing in fourth place. In the 2013–14 UEFA Champions League group stage, Schalke's opponents were FCSB, FC Basel and Chelsea. Schalke ultimately finished the group stage in second place, behind Chelsea, and was eliminated in the round of 16 by Real Madrid CF.

The most prominent Schalke addition was the arrival of Kevin-Prince Boateng from Milan. After a disappointing first round of the 2013–14 Bundesliga that saw Schalke in seventh place in the Bundesliga table, as well as an early exit from the 2013–14 DFB-Pokal in the first knockout round, the club played their most successful second half of the season in club history. The season was marked by a glut of injuries to key squad players, including Jefferson Farfán and Klaas-Jan Huntelaar, for almost the entire season. It also led to performance related discussions about head coach Jens Keller. Partially, Schalke fielded up to ten young players with potential who played in the Schalke youth system throughout the season. Among the brightest young player discoveries of the 2013–14 season were Max Meyer and Leon Goretzka. The young Schalke squad won 11 out of 17 matches, totalling 36 points. At the end of the 2013–14 season, the club finished in third place in the Bundesliga table to qualify for their third-straight UEFA Champions League appearance, a feat Schalke had never before achieved.

On 7 October 2014, after a 1–2 defeat to 1899 Hoffenheim and after amassing just eight points from seven matches, Keller was sacked and succeeded by Roberto Di Matteo.

In the 2014–15 UEFA Champions League, Schalke 04 finished second in a group with Chelsea, Sporting CP and Maribor. Later on, they played against the reigning champion Real Madrid again in the round of 16, where they lost the first leg at home 0–2, but they won 4–3 at the Santiago Bernabéu Stadium. After finishing sixth in the 2014–15 season, the club announced the resignation of head coach Roberto Di Matteo on 26 May 2015. Schalke 04 then played in the Europa League, in the 2015–16 and 2016–17 seasons, and were eliminated by Shakhtar Donetsk and Ajax respectively.

Starting with the 2017–18 season, Domenico Tedesco took over the managerial spot for Schalke 04. At the end of the season, he managed to lead the team to finish as runners-up to Bayern Munich. On 29 July 2018, the team's captain, Benedikt Höwedes, decided to leave after more than ten years at the club.

2019–present: Financial crisis, relegation, and return to the Bundesliga
In the 2018–19 UEFA Champions League, Schalke 04 lost 2–10 in aggregate to Manchester City in the round of 16. Two days later, on 14 March 2019, Tedesco was relieved of his duties. Huub Stevens and Mike Büskens took over as caretaker managers. On 9 May 2019, David Wagner was appointed as head coach of Schalke 04 on a three-year contract until 30 June 2022.

Schalke was hit particularly hard by the COVID-19 pandemic, and in April 2020 the club said that it was threatened by bankruptcy. Against the backdrop of a worsened financial situation caused by a high level of debt and a decrease in revenue related to restrictions put in place to combat the COVID-19 pandemic, the club decided to introduce a player salary cap of €2.5 million per year.

In the second half of the 2019–20 season, Schalke set a new club record of 16 league games without a win between 25 January and 27 June 2020. Despite this losing streak, Wagner remained as manager, with Clemens Tönnies stepping down from his role as the chairman of Schalke's supervisory board after 19 years in service instead.

Schalke started with significant difficulties into the 2020–21 season. After 8–0 and 4–0 thrashings away at the hands of Bayern Munich and RB Leipzig and a 1–3 loss at home against Werder Bremen, Schalke was last in the league table after three games, with one goal scored and fifteen conceded. After only two match days, Schalke dismissed David Wagner as head coach on 27 September in the aftermath of the loss against Bremen. At 1.08 average points per game, Wagner was then the lowest-scoring head coach in Schalke's recent history.

Three days later, Manuel Baum was nominated as Wagner's successor, with Naldo, a former Schalke player, as assistant coach. Baum, who had taken over from Wagner at a winless streak of 18 games, was unable to win a single Bundesliga game between the 3rd and 12th match days, and was dismissed ahead of the 13th match day against Arminia Bielefeld. Huub Stevens once again returned as head coach, beginning his fourth tenure. Baum's tenure had brought the winless streak up from 18 to 28 Bundesliga games, bringing Schalke to the brink of breaking the alltime record of 31 winless games, set by SC Tasmania 1900 Berlin in the 1965–66 season. Stevens did not change Schalke's fortunes in his first game, losing the home game against Arminia Bielefeld, themselves in 16th place and thus threatened by relegation, with a 0–1 scoreline.

On 27 December 2020, Schalke 04 announced that they signed a contract with Swiss manager Christian Gross to be the head coach of the club until the end of the season, making him the fourth head coach for Schalke 04 during the 2020–21 season. Under Gross, Schalke's negative streak continued with a 3–0 loss to Hertha BSC, marking the 30th consecutive winless game, a losing streak of 358 days. On 9 January 2021 Schalke finally recorded a victory over 1899 Hoffenheim, which meant they avoided matching Tasmania Berlin's record. It remained Schalke's only victory under Gross, who was sacked as head coach after just eleven matches on 28 February 2021, following losses against rival Borussia Dortmund (0–4) and VFB Stuttgart (1–5). Alongside Gross, sporting director Jochen Schneider, team coordinator Sascha Riether, assistant coach Rainer Widmayer and fitness coach Werner Leuthard were also relieved of their duties. At 0.45 average points per game, Gross was the least successful head coach at Schalke since Karl-Heinz Marotzke in 1967.

On 2 March 2021, Dimitrios Grammozis was announced as new head coach for Schalke 04. Grammozis started with a scoreless draw against Mainz 05, but his team was unable to collect any points in the two following matches, which were lost 5–0 against VfL Wolfsburg and 3–0 against Borussia Mönchengladbach. Schalke did not score a goal in the first three matches under Grammozis, a joined negative record for the club (Helmut Schulte in 1992–93 and Markus Weinzierl in 2016–17 also waited for the first goal until their fourth match as head coach for Schalke). Against Borussia Mönchengladbach, Schalke conceded its fifth own goal of the season, yet another negative record.

Relegation to the 2. Bundesliga was confirmed on 20 April 2021, as Schalke 04 lost 1–0 to Arminia Bielefeld, which led to riots by Schalke supporters.

On 28 February 2022, following Russia's invasion of Ukraine, Schalke cancelled their contract with main sponsor Gazprom, further straining the club's financial situation. Grammozis was sacked as head coach on 6 March 2022, as promotion back to the Bundesliga appeared uncertain. He was replaced by Mike Büskens as caretaker manager until the end of the season. Schalke recovered under Büskens, winning eight of the remaining nine matches. The club secured promotion on 7 May 2022, following a 3–2 victory over FC St. Pauli that guaranteed a top-two finish in the 2. Bundesliga. Fans invaded the pitch in celebration. One week later Schalke won the 2. Bundesliga in dramatic fashion after a 88th minute winner by Simon Terodde defeating 1. FC Nürnberg 2–1.

At the end of the 2021–22 season, Büskens moved back to the position of assistant coach. On 7 June 2022, Schalke appointed Frank Kramer as head coach. As a result of the club's financial problems, most of the players who were essential for the success in the previous season, like Ko Itakura, could not be kept, and Schalke struggled to be competitive at the beginning of the 2022–23 season. Following a series of humiliating losses, including a 1–5 against Hoffenheim, Kramer was relieved of his duties on 19 October 2022. At the time, Schalke was 17th in the Bundesliga after ten matchdays. Matthias Kreutzer took over as caretaker manager. A week after Kramer's dismissal, on 26 October 2022, sporting director Rouven Schröder also announced his instant resignation.

On 27 October 2022, Thomas Reis was named as Schalke's new head coach. The first match under Reis, against SC Freiburg, was lost 0–2, marking Schalke's seventh consecutive loss. After the game, commentators like Huub Stevens praised the team for its better organization, compared to previous matches. Schalke finished the first half of the 2022–23 Bundesliga season in 18th and last position in the table, with just nine points to their name. Following a humiliating 1–6 against RB Leipzig on match day 17, the club noticeably improved, especially in the defense. Between match days 18 and 21, Schalke played 0–0 four times in a row, a new Bundesliga record. The following two matches were won, and on 4 March 2023, Schalke left the last place in the table for the first time since October 2022.

On 19 February 2023, four people were seriously injured when a group of about 100 people, assumed to be supporters of Schalke's rivals Rot-Weiss Essen and Borussia Dortmund, attacked a group of Schalke supporters with baseball bats and screwdrivers. The incident sparked fears over the upcoming derby against Dortmund. This came less than three weeks after the police had uncovered a possible plot by radical Dortmund supporters, who had tried to hide razor blades behind stickers in the stadium ahead of Dortmund's match against Mainz. In 2014, the police had warned of a similar danger ahead of the derby, after razor blades were found in the stadium hidden behind anti-Schalke stickers. On 11 March 2023, in the 100th derby between the two clubs, Schalke played 2–2 against Borussia Dortmund, who were in second place at the time. This ended Dortmund's streak of eight wins in a row. The police have called the match "extremely peaceful" and drew a positive balance.

Sponsors and finances

As of 2022, the headline sponsor of Schalke 04 is the China-based electronics manufacturer Hisense. The Russia-based hydrocarbon giant Gazprom was dropped in February 2022 as a result of the Russian invasion of Ukraine. Additional sponsors include Dusseldorf-based insurance group ERGO Insurance Group; Munich-based automotive manufacturer BMW; and its motorcycle division BMW Motorrad; Spanish-based security insurance company Reale Seguros; China-based telecommunications company Huawei; cyber gambling and sports betting company bet-at-home.com; beverage giant Coca-Cola; North Rhine Westphalia-based brewery Veltins; and the current manufacturer of Schalke's squad kits, Germany-based Adidas.

In terms of operating income, Schalke possesses an operating income of €13 million, and 12 per cent debt as of May 2019. As of 2019, Schalke generated the 14th-highest revenue of any football club in the world at €291 million.

In May 2019, Schalke 04 were still ranked by Forbes magazine as the 14th-richest football club in the world, at €683 million, a decrease of 3 per cent from the previous year. As of 2022, the club is no longer listed among the top 20 for either revenue or value.

Schalke 04 is among the Bundesliga teams that were hit hardest by the ongoing COVID-19 pandemic, and in April 2020 the club said it was threatened by bankruptcy.

Players

Current squad

Out on loan

Reserve team

Notable former players

In the year 2000, the supporters voted for Schalker Jahrhundertelf, the "Team of the Century":

Records

Stadium
Schalke's stadium, known as the Veltins-Arena under a sponsorship agreement with Veltins brewery, was built in the summer of 2001 and has a capacity of 62,271 spectators. Schalke regularly draws sell-out crowds to what is widely regarded as one of the most modern and best multi-use facilities in Europe. The facility was previously known as the Arena AufSchalke and replaced the Parkstadion (capacity of 62,000) built in 1973. Prior to this, the club played its matches in the Glückauf-Kampfbahn, constructed in 1928 with a capacity of 35,000. The facility was used for amateur matches during its later years with a reduced capacity of 5,000.

Fan culture

The number of members of Schalke 04 grew from 10,000 in 1991 to 160,000 in 2022. This figure makes Schalke 04 the second-biggest sports club in Germany and fourth-biggest sports club in the world, behind Bayern Munich, Benfica, and CA Boca Juniors. As of 2022, Schalke is ranked as the 94th-best football club in Europe and in Continental Europe by UEFA's UEFA club rankings. A representation of the Schalke 04 membership structure in 2014 showed, among other things, a female share of 20 per cent and a share of the age group up to ten years of 14 per cent. Around 30 per cent of the members were not from North Rhine-Westphalia. Apart from Gelsenkirchen (10,197 members) and its immediate neighbouring towns, the members of Schalke 04 also come from more distant cities such as Cologne (1,117) and Berlin (932). This high growth in Schalke 04 membership is also promoted by promotions of Schalke 04, as from 2013 to further "advertise Schalke 04 brand".

On 21 August 2013, Schalke 04 played their first home match of the 2013–14 season, a UEFA Champions League qualifier at the Veltins-Arena against the Greek runners-up PAOK (led by former head coach Huub Stevens), drawing 1–1. The match and result was more than overshadowed by a controversial police operation in the "S04 Ultras Gelsenkirchen" block of the Veltins-Arena against the fans of the home team with nearly 80 of the home team's fans injured. The return match was won 3–2 by Schalke without any of their supporters allowed to attend the match.

Fan Club Association
Schalke 04 Fan Club Association (SFCV) is an umbrella organization which, according to their own statement, has an estimated 1,500 fan clubs. Of those listed by the SFCV, 860 Schalke 04 fan clubs in October 2012 were divided geographically as follows: an estimated 200 were in Ruhr, 360 in the rest of North Rhine-Westphalia and 300 in the other federal states. A member of the board of SFCV has a permanent seat on the board of FC Schalke 04 and in 2013 SFCV merged with the "Ultras Gelsenkirchen" and later the supporters' club, Schalke Fan-Initiative eV with several members of strong fan groups from the SFCV, as is clear from the merger of the SFCV with the fan section of S04 has not adequately represented the fan interests.

Friendships

The fan-base of Schalke is connected, in a friendly way, with the supporters of 1. FC Nürnberg and Dutch club Twente. The friendship with Nürnberg is the oldest connection between two fan-bases in Germany. Before a match between both clubs, the official club songs are played.

Club songs
Blau und weiß, wie lieb ich Dich ("Blue and White, How I Love You") is the official club song.
Das Steigerlied, traditional German mining song, played before every match.
Blau und Weiß ein Leben lang ("Blue and white a life-long") is the goal tune.
Königsblauer S04 ("Royal Blue S04") played after every match

Popular unofficial chants are
Der Mythos vom Schalker Markt ("The Myth of the Schalke Market"),
Opa Pritschikowski ("Grandpa Pritschikowski"),
Von der Emscher bis zum Bosporus ("From the Emscher to the Bosphorus"),
Wir schlugen Roda... ("We beat Roda..."),
Die Eurofighter sind wieder da ("The Eurofighter are back again"),
Für deine Farben leben und sterben wir ("For your colours we live and die"),
Wir lieben alle nur den FC Schalke ("We all love only FC Schalke"),
Wir sind die Fans ("We are the fans"),
Hurra wir sind die Schalker Knappen ("Hurray we are the Schalke Knappen"),
Kohle unter unser'n Füßen ("Coal under our feet"), and
Steht auf, wenn ihr Schalker seid ("Stand up if you're Schalke"), sung to the melody of "Go West" by the Pet Shop Boys (itself a cover of a Village People song).

Revierderby

The Revierderby is the rivalry between local clubs Schalke 04 and Borussia Dortmund, both situated in the densely populated Ruhr region. Because of the small geographical distances between the clubs (roughly 30 kilometers), fans of opposing clubs often meet in everyday life. The term may be used in any match between two football clubs of the Ruhr region (such as VfL Bochum, Rot-Weiss Essen or MSV Duisburg), but the term is most commonly associated with the rivalry between Schalke and Dortmund due to the derby's popularity and prestige. To some fans, the win of the derby itself is more important than the actual performance in the Bundesliga.

In popular culture

Schalke has been subject of a feature-length film called Fußball ist unser Leben ("Football is our life"), shown in 1999. Actors Uwe Ochsenknecht and Ralf Richter, both of whom were in the award-winning film Das Boot played the main roles, while many persons associated with Schalke had cameo roles, such as manager Rudi Assauer, coaches Huub Stevens and Helmut Schulte, and player Yves Eigenrauch. Also featured were prominent fans like Manfred Breuckmann, Ulrich Potofski or DJ Hooligan. The film is a comedy about "Hans", a Schalke fanatic, and his three pals who somehow get involved in kidnapping and trying to bring back to form the team's new star player "Di Ospeo" and in the process bet Hans' house that their idol will score in the final match.

"Schalke" is mentioned in the film Das Boot when the bosun tells the crew in their ward room, "I got bad news for you men. Schalke lost 5–0, looks like we won't be in the final this year."

Honours
Role of honour

Domestic
German Championship
Winners: 1934, 1935, 1937, 1939, 1940, 1942, 1958
DFB-Pokal/German Cup
Winners: 1937, 1971–72, 2000–01, 2001–02, 2010–11
DFB-Ligapokal/German League Cup
Winners: 2005
DFL-Supercup/German Super Cup
Winners: 2011
2. Bundesliga
Winners: 1981–82, 1990–91, 2021–22

International

UEFA Cup
Winners: 1996–97
UEFA Intertoto Cup
Winners: 2003, 2004
 Cup of the Alps
 Winners: 1968

UEFA club coefficient ranking

Youth
Domestic
Under 19 Bundesliga
Winners: 1976, 2006, 2012, 2015
Runners-up: 1975, 1980, 1981
Under 19 Bundesliga West
Winners: 2006, 2012, 2013, 2014, 2015
Under 17 Bundesliga
Winners: 1978, 2002
Runners-up: 1977, 1980
Under 17 Bundesliga West
Winners: 2013

Double
1937: Championship and Cup

Corporate structure

Notable coaches

Other departments

The basketball department played in the 1988–89 season in the National Basketball League Basketball Bundesliga and from 2004 for several seasons in the ProA, the second highest basketball league in Germany. 2009 saw Schalke 04 voluntarily withdrawal from the ProA. Currently, the team competes in ProB. The club founded a blind football department in 2015, which plays in the Blindenfußball-Bundesliga.

The women's football club was initially dissolved in the mid-1980s, but achieved some notable successes, including five-time Westphalia championships, and competed in the German championship and DFB Cup.

Other longstanding departments include the handball department, which was founded in 1926 and competed in the Gaumeister, Gauliga during Nazi Germany, and the current top division. The athletic department was founded in 1922, with the club's former players including Olympic silver medallist decathlete Frank Busemann, and 2003 European Athletics Junior Championships gold 200-metre runner, Sebastian Ernst. The table tennis department was founded in 1947, and competes in the Westphalia district league. The women's team was one of the early participants in the national league until it withdrew in 1956.

In 2016, Schalke acquired League of Legends e-sports team Elements, becoming the second professional sports team with a League of Legends division, after Beşiktaş. In early June, they debuted in the European League of Legends Championship Series, the top level of professional League of Legends competition in Europe. The club also announced former Rot-Weiss Oberhausen and Sportfreunde Siegen midfielder and SK Gaming co-founder Tim Reichert as Head of ESport.

See also
 The Football Club Social Alliance
 Forbes' list of the most valuable football clubs

Bibliography
 Bodo Berg: More than a game: from the life of a football fan; with photos of Yves own smoke. Verlg the workshop, Göttingen 2000, .
 Jenrich Burkh: Royal Blue Planet, Göttingen 2004, .
 Stefan Goch / Norbert Silver Bach: Between blue and white is gray, Essen 2005, .
 Hardy Green: Faith, Love, Schalke. The complete history of FC Schalke 04, The Workshop, Göttingen 2011, .
 Helmut Wood: Schalke is priceless, Gelsenkirchen, 1991,  .
 Helmut Wood: Schalke smile. Curiosities and concrete of fans and dreamers – experienced and collected, Gelsenkirchen 1984, .
 William Herbert Koch: The Royal Blues: the phenomenon Schalke 04, Düsseldorf 1973, .
 Olivier Kruschinski: Blue and white for a lifetime. A season with Schalke, Herten 2005, .
 Georg Röwekamp: The legend lives on. The history of FC Schalke 04, Göttingen 1996 [and newer edition], .
 Schalke Fan Initiative (Eds.), The tip of the Eichbergs. Most scandals of FC Schalke 04. plain text, Essen 2005, .
 Jörg Seven Eick, Thomas Spiegel, Gerd Voss (Eds.): 100 Schalke years – 100 stories Schalke. Plain text, Essen 2004, .
 Matt Ford: "Bundesliga: Schalke relegated for first time in 30 years". 2021. https://www.dw.com/en/bundesliga-schalke-relegated-for-first-time-in-30-years/a-57270976

References

External links

FC Schalke 04 at UEFA

 
Association football clubs established in 1904
Football clubs in Germany
Football clubs in North Rhine-Westphalia
Mining association football clubs in Germany
1904 establishments in Germany
Multi-sport clubs in Germany
UEFA Cup winning clubs
S
Bundesliga clubs
Sport in Gelsenkirchen
2. Bundesliga clubs